Events from the year 1868 in literature .

Events
January – Émile Zola defends his first major novel, Thérèse Raquin (1867), against charges of pornography and corruption of morals. 
January 4–August 8 – Wilkie Collins' epistolary novel The Moonstone: a Romance is serialised in All the Year Round (U.K.), being published in book format in July by Tinsley Brothers of London. It is seen as a precursor of full-length mystery fiction (with its introduction of the police detective Sergeant Cuff) and the psychological thriller.
January 9 – John William De Forest, writing for The Nation, calls for a more specifically American literature; the essay's title, "The Great American Novel", is the first known use of the term.
April 29 – The Court of King's Bench (England) decides on appeal the legal case Regina v. Hicklin on interpretation of the word "obscene" in the Obscene Publications Act 1857, applying the "Hicklin test": that any part of a publication with a "tendency... to deprave and corrupt those whose minds are open to such immoral influences, and into whose hands a publication of this sort may fall" makes the whole publication obscene, regardless of the author's intentions.
September – The first volume of Louisa May Alcott's novel for girls Little Women is published by Roberts Brothers of Boston, Massachusetts.
November
Robert Browning's narrative poem The Ring and the Book begins four-part publication by Smith, Elder & Co. in London. It is a major commercial and critical success.
Norman MacLeod, editor of Good Words (U.K.), begins publishing its companion juvenile version, Good Words for the Young. The first issue begins the serial publication of George MacDonald's At the Back of the North Wind.
December – The Globe Theatre (Newcastle Street) in London opens with the première of the recently bankrupted Henry James Byron's semi-autobiographical comedy Cyril's Success.
unknown dates
The first edition of The World Almanac and Book of Facts is published by the New York World.
The first substantial translation into English from Dream of the Red Chamber is made by Edward Charles Bowra.
Tauchnitz publishers of Leipzig begin their Collection of German Authors, a series of cheap, authorized paperback reprints.

New books

Fiction
R. M. Ballantyne – Deep Down
Henry Ward Beecher – Norwood, or Villagtdve Life in New England
Mary Elizabeth Braddon – Dead-Sea Fruit 
Mary Elizabeth Braddon – Run to Earth
Mortimer Collins – Sweet Anne Page
Wilkie Collins – The Moonstone
Alphonse Daudet - Le Petit Chose
Comte de Lautréamont (anonymously as "***") – Les Chants de Maldoror, Chant premier
Fyodor Dostoevsky – The Idiot («Идио́т»)
Émile Gaboriau – Slaves of Paris (Les Esclaves de Paris)
Hermann Goedsche – Biarritz
Bret Harte – The Luck of Roaring Camp
Sheridan Le Fanu – Haunted Lives
George MacDonald – Robert Falconer
Anthony Trollope - Linda Tressel
Elizabeth Stuart Phelps Ward - The Gates Ajar
Émile Zola – Madeleine Ferat

Children and young people
Louisa May Alcott – Little Women (Vol. 1; Vol. 2 in 1869)
Horatio Alger Jr. – Ragged Dick (book publication)
Horatio Alger Jr. – Fame and Fortune
Horatio Alger Jr. – Struggling Upward
Rosa Nouchette Carey – Nellie's Memories
James Greenwood – The Purgatory of Peter the Cruel
Hesba Stretton – Little Meg's Children
Jules Verne – In Search of the Castaways (Les Enfants du capitaine Grant)

Drama
Samson Bodnărescu – Rienzi
Henry James Byron – Cyril's Success
Aleksandr Ostrovsky – Enough Stupidity in Every Wise Man (Na vsyakogo mudretsa dovolno prostoty)
Hendrik Jan Schimmel – Struensee
Aleksey Konstantinovich Tolstoy – Tsar Fyodor Ioannovich

Poetry
William Morris – The Earthly Paradise Volume 1

Non-fiction
Elizabeth Keckley - Behind the Scenes: Thirty Years a Slave and Four Years in the White House
Eliza Lynn Linton – The Girl of the Period
Edward A. Pollard – The Lost Cause Regained
John Wisden – Cricket and How to Play it
World Almanac (first edition)

Births
January 1 – Sophia Alice Callahan, American Muscogee novelist and teacher (died 1894)
January 5 – Edward Garnett, English writer, critic and literary editor (died 1937)
February 4 – Miyake Kaho (三宅花圃), Japanese novelist, essayist and poet (died 1943)
February 10 – William Allen White, American journalist (died 1944)
February 23 – W. E. B. Du Bois, American sociologist, historian and Pan-Africanist (died 1963)
March 28 – Maxim Gorky, Russian novelist and dramatist (died 1936)
April 1 – Edmond Rostand, French poet and novelist (died 1918)
May 6 – Gaston Leroux, French journalist and novelist (died 1927)
May 7 – Stanisław Przybyszewski, Polish novelist, dramatist and poet (died 1927)
July 10 – Afevork Ghevre Jesus, Ethiopian novelist and linguist (died 1947)
 July 14 – Gertrude Bell, English archaeologist, writer, spy and administrator (died 1926)
July 17 – Henri Nathansen, Danish writer and stage director (died 1944)
August 6 – Paul Claudel, French poet, dramatist and diplomat (died 1955)
August 23 – Edgar Lee Masters, American poet, biographer, dramatist and lawyer (died 1950)
September 9 – Mary Hunter Austin, American writer of fiction and non-fiction (died 1934) 
September 14 – Théodore Botrel, French poet and dramatist (died 1925)
October 18 – Ernst Didring, Swedish novelist (died 1931)
November 5 – Kassian Bogatyrets, Rusyn priest, politician and historian (died 1960)
November 14 – Steele Rudd, Australian author (died 1935)
November 30 – Angela Brazil, English writer of schoolgirl fiction (died 1947)
c. December 12 – Stephen Hudson (born Sydney Schiff), English novelist, translator and arts patron (died 1944)
December 14 – Louise Hammond Willis Snead, American writer, artist, and composter (died 1958)
December 19 – Eleanor H. Porter, American novelist (died 1920)
December 25 – Ahmed Shawqi, Egyptian poet (died 1932)
December 28 – Bucura Dumbravă, Romanian novelist and spiritualist (died 1926)

Deaths
January 6 – Scarlat Vârnav, Romanian journalist, educationist and librarian (digestive illness, year of birth unknown)
January 24 – John David Macbride, English Arabist and academic (born 1778)
March 8 – Jón Thoroddsen elder, Icelandic poet and novelist (born 1818 or 1819)
June 6 – Daniel Pierce Thompson, American novelist and lawyer (born 1795)
June 15 – Robert Vaughan, English historian and religious writer (born 1795)
June 18 – Charles Harpur, Australian poet (tuberculosis, born 1813)
July 6 – Samuel Lover, Irish writer and composer (born 1797)
July 30 – Mihály Tompa, Hungarian lyric poet (born 1819)
August 24 – Constantin Negruzzi (Costache Negruzzi), Romanian poet, novelist and playwright (born 1808)
August 25 – Jacob van Lennep, Dutch poet and novelist (born 1802)
September 24 – Henry Hart Milman, English historian (born 1791)
November 30 – August Blanche, Swedish journalist, novelist and statesman (heart attack; born 1811)

Awards
Newdigate Prize – John Alexander Stewart

References

 
Years of the 19th century in literature